HMNZS Inchkeith was an  minesweeper of the Royal New Zealand Navy. She was one of the first ships to be commissioned into the newly created Royal New Zealand Navy. She was bought alongside three other ships for a price of £65,000 each. On 15 March 1942 Inchkeith was involved with a collision with HMS Marsdale, damaging her superstructure.

During World War II, HMNZS Inchkeith worked escorting various convoys in both the Atlantic and Pacific theatres before transitioning to a primarily minesweeping role around the Hauraki Gulf and the Bay of Islands, although filling some escort duties.

By 1957, Inchkeith was declared surplus and were sold for scrapping in August 1958, and was broken up along with her sister ships at the Lighter Basin in Freemans Bay, Auckland.

References 

Isles-class trawlers
World War II minesweepers of New Zealand
1941 ships